Biñan, officially the City of Biñan, is a 1st class component city in the province of Laguna, Philippines. According to the 2020 census, it has a population of 407,437 people.

Biñan, also known as Biniang, has become both a suburban residential community of Metro Manila and a location for some of the Philippines' largest industrial estates and export processing zones. Prior to its cityhood in 2010, Biñan was the richest municipality in the Philippines with an annual gross income of ₱677 million (US$14.383 million) and net income of ₱250 million (US$5.308 million), as of 2007 by the Commission On Audit. According to the 2020 census, it has a population of 407,437, making it the third largest in population in the province of Laguna, after Calamba and Santa Rosa.

By virtue of Republic Act 10658, signed on March 27, 2015, by President Benigno Aquino III, Biñan has been separated from the First Congressional District of Laguna and formed the Lone Congressional District of Biñan. The first representative, the former mayor of the city, has been elected during the 2016 elections, unopposed.

Etymology
Where Biñan got its name is a mystery. Some deduced that before Captain Juan de Salcedo proceeded to Cainta and Taytay finally reaching Bay, he landed in Biñan. According to the story, Padres Alfonso de Alvarado and Diego Espinar planted a huge wooden cross on the spot where the present-day San Isidro Labrador parish stands and co-celebrated a Thanksgiving Mass. Curious natives gathered and the two Spanish missionaries took advantage of the situation. They baptized each one of them. From then on, old folks say they called the place “Binyagan,” which means a baptismal place. The Spanish tongue's difficulty in pronouncing the local dialect acquired for the once town its name— "Biñan".

History

Captain Juan de Salcedo discovered and founded Biñan at the end of June 1571, a month after Miguel López de Legazpi established Manila when he explored the largest freshwater lake in the Philippines and second in Asia (Laguna de Bay).

When the seat of the provincial government of the Provincia de la Laguna de Bay was moved from Bay to Pagsanjan in 1688, Biñan separated from Tabuco (now the city of Cabuyao).

In 1791, during the time of Pablo Faustino, Santa Rosa separated from Biñan. The following year, January 15 Sta Rosa de Lima was established and became an independent town.

Historically, Biñan is nationally recognized in the books related to the biography of José Rizal, the country's national hero. It was in June 1869 when José Rizal as a young boy went to Biñan with his brother Paciano. They proceeded to his aunt's house near the town proper where they were to be lodged. Here, his first formal education was entrusted to Maestro Justiniano Aquino Cruz who after a year and a half of tutelage advised young Rizal to continue higher education in Manila. In honor of José Rizal, a plaque of recognition was bestowed on the house where he stayed at. A monument now stands at the center of Biñan's plaza in recognition of Biñan's affiliation to Rizal.

Cityhood

On February 2, 2010, by the virtue of the Republic Act No. 9740, Biñan became a component city after its voters accepted the ratification in the plebiscite. It became the 4th city in the province and 139th in the Philippines.

Geography
It is bounded on the north by San Pedro, on the west by General Mariano Alvarez, Carmona, and Silang, on the south by Santa Rosa, while on the east lies Laguna de Bay, the largest lake in the country.

The city covers a total land area of  that represents 2.5 percent of the entire Laguna province. In 2008, Biñan had a total population of 269,608. It is the fourth most populated in the province (9.8% of the provincial population), next only to Calamba (12.66%), San Pedro City (11.42%), and Santa Rosa City (9.92%).

Topography
Biñan is generally plain with 85.33 percent of its total area having a slope of zero to 2.5 percent. This covers all the 24 barangays except for small portions of Barangay Biñan and San Francisco having a slope ranging from 2.6 to 25 percent, meaning it is gently sloping to strongly sloping. With more than three-fourths of its area generally level to nearly level, this makes Biñan suitable for agricultural and urban development.

Soil properties
Of the eleven-soil series that compose the land area of Laguna, Carmona and Gingua series covers about two types that can only be seen in Biñan. Agricultural land in these areas is primarily devoted to rice and sugar production.

Barangays
Biñan comprises 24 barangays, all classified as urban. Barangay San Francisco occupies the largest area which is about 16.83 percent of Biñan while Barangay Casile has the smallest area with only  or 0.27 percent.

Climate
The climate of Biñan is characterized by two pronounced seasons: dry from November to April and wet during the rest of the year. Biñan is protected by mountains in the peripheral areas, and thus it is making the area cooler.

Demographics

Religion

The majority of the people are Roman Catholics. Other religious groups include are the Church of Jesus Christ of Latter-day Saints, the Members Church of God International (Ang Dating Daan/The Old Path/El Camino Antiguo), Biyaya Ng Diyos Christian Fellowship, United Church of Christ in the Philippines (UCCP), Jesus Is Lord Church (JIL), The United Methodist Church, Presbyterian Churches, Baptist and Bible Fundamental churches.

Economy 

Biñan has been popularly recognized as the trading center area immediately south of Metro Manila. The city has the largest public market in the province of Laguna, and in the Calabarzon Region. Retailers from nearby towns often plow the city proper to purchase goods and merchandise intended to be sold elsewhere. Biñan has also been the center of commerce in the region because of the numerous banking institutions across the city, plus the ever-growing number of commercial establishments and emerging shopping centers.

A common sight is the preparations and setting up of the wholesalers and the arrival of jeepneys and trucks carrying various items such as fruits, vegetables, dry goods, dairy products, meat, fish, etc. The market activity would be 24 hours with peak reaching the early hours (3:00–7:00 am) as Filipinos are known to work in the early hours of the day trying to prevent exposure to the heating sun.

The city is also known for a type of pancake made from rice flour, topped with cheese or butter (Puto Biñan). There are also slices of savory salted egg on top to contrast the mildly sweet pancake base. The best-known makers of Puto in Biñan are located in the barangay of San Vicente, and the city is renowned as "The Home of the Famous Puto Biñan in Laguna".

Major industries
Manufacturing of footwear, headwear, puto and special pasalubong like pinipig, ampaw etc.

Shopping centers
Notable malls and shopping centers in the city include the Southwoods Mall (managed by Megaworld), Pavilion Mall (managed by Ayala Malls), Central Mall Biñan, C. Morales Mall, and Umbria Commercial Center.

Investment sites

Biñan has two industrial parks namely, the Laguna International Industrial Park (LIIP) and the Laguna Technopark Incorporated (LTI). The two industrial parks have created a good image in contributing favorably in Biñan as well as in the Philippine economy in terms of local employment and the generation of foreign exchange. To date, Biñan has benefited a large number of residents being employed in different companies there. To name a few, they are Honda Parts Manufacturing Corporation, Kito Corporation, Nissin Brake, Ryonan Electric, Cirtek Electronics, SunPower, Nidec Corporation, Isuzu Philippines, Atlas Copco, Diageo, Furukawa Electric, Takata, Toshiba Philippines, Optodev, Inc., Transitions Optical Philippines Inc., Hitachi Computer Products Asia, Amkor Technology Philippines, Inc., Integrated Microelectronics, Inc. (IMI), TDK, Gardenia Bakeries Philippines Inc., and several other multi-national companies.

As of 2008, Biñan, headed by its Historical, Tourism and Cultural Council has formed "Biñan Business Club", a non-government organization composed of all business establishments of the said municipality. The Biñan Business Club works to anticipate trends and provide support to help local business enterprises and the community face them head on. The Club commits itself to the essential aspects of economic development and poverty alleviation. It knows that the Biñan community counts on the help of the organization to attract, retain and enhance business through traditional and non-traditional strategies.

One Asia Business Center is a  development located within the Jubilation New Biñan. This business park will be a major component of an integrated master planned development of Jubilation or what is called the New Biñan City which is composed of residential, commercial, recreational and institutional uses.

Inaugurated on July 25, 2012, Southwoods City, located in Barangay San Francisco, situated at Southwoods Exit along the South Luzon Expressway, has been proclaimed by the Philippine Economic Zone Authority (PEZA) as of July 2010 as a Special Economic Zone. It is a  project which will include a strip mall, residential condominium towers, an outlet center, a lifestyle park and a Business Process Outsourcing (BPO) center, among other facilities. This soon will become the Calabarzon's premiere BPO and shopping hub.

Transportation
The city is accessible to all types of land transportation via South Luzon Expressway through Greenfield City/Unilab (Mamplasan), Southwoods, and Carmona exits. The new Cavite–Laguna Expressway, which would extend up to Kawit, Cavite, also starts in the city, particularly at Mamplasan Exit. The Manila South Road (N1) also passes through the city. General Malvar Street, mostly part of N65, connects the city to the province of Cavite.

Government

Elected officials
A new city hall was constructed on Barangay Zapote to reflect its status as a component city. The former municipal hall remains standing in the city proper, now offices the Sentrong Pangkultura ng Biñan (Biñan Center for Culture and Arts) to maintain the city's culture and arts tradition.

Elected officials

Former Elected officials

City seal
The former mayor of Biñan, Marlyn Alonte, envisioned the new seal of the city, as Biñan became a city of the province of Laguna. The seal symbolized the following:

The Rizal Monument is used to depict the heroism of the National Hero of the Philippines, Dr. José Rizal, who had his first formal education at Biñan under the tutelage of Maestro Justiniano Aquino Cruz who after a year and a half of tutelage advised the young Rizal to continue his education in Manila.
The large mortar and pestle signify subterranean and earth-related resources, thus emblematizing the agricultural activities of the city, the renowned “Puto Biñan” and the “family” represents solidarity and the result of human industry and initiative in the areas of manufacturing and intellectual production.
The “2010” represents the year that Republic Act 9740 was signed into law creating the City of Biñan and ratified by majority vote of its people during the plebiscite held on February 2, 2010.
The book signifies the city's continuous quest for knowledge and its commitment to providing quality free education to its constituents.
The industries represent the budding industries located at the Laguna Technopark and the Laguna International Industrial Park.
The Heroes Monument symbolizes the bravery, sacrifice and valor of Biñan's ancestors.
The pair of slippers had been adapted from the old Municipal Seal which, together with the cap represent the small businesses which originated from Biñan and entrepreneurial skills of its people.
The 24 barangays that constitute the demographic profile of the Municipality of Biñan.
Their golden color signifies their individual verdant and abundant indigenous resources readily available for conversion into productive and profitable uses.
The elements enumerated above are encircled at the outer edge by a golden circle, wherein the words “City of Biñan” are written within.
The two golden stars flanking the words “City of Biñan” represent Service and Integrity.

The Lone District of Biñan

On January 26, 2015, a 15–0 vote from senators approved the House Bill No. 3917 in the third and final reading, amending the charter city of Biñan to a congressional district in Laguna and will be separated from the first district. Republic Act No. 10658, which President Aquino signed into law on March 27, 2015, separated Biñan from the first legislative district of Laguna. Under the law, the incumbent representative of the first district of Laguna will continue to represent the new district until the expiration of his term. The Commission on Elections was tasked to issue the necessary rules and regulations to implement the measure within 30 days after its effectivity. Danilo Fernandez, the then representative of the 1st district of Laguna, hailed the passage of the law, saying it would improve the delivery of services to Biñan residents. He said Biñan has met the population and revenue requirements to be a legislative district.

Education

Biñan is also considered the educational center of the first congressional district of Laguna, having the greatest number of secondary and tertiary schools in the area. Most barangays in the city also have their own respective public elementary schools.

Biñan has 3 universities: the University of Perpetual Help System Laguna, the first university in the city, located at Barangay Santo Niño via the National Highway; the Biñan campus of the Polytechnic University of the Philippines, located at Barangay Zapote; and the Laguna Campus of De La Salle University at Barangays Malamig and Biñan.

Some other prominent schools and colleges in the city include:

Local educational institutions
AMA Biñan Campus
Caritas Don Bosco School
Colegio San Agustin – Biñan
La Consolacion College – Biñan
Saint Michael's College of Laguna
Alpha Angelicum Academy
Ann Arbor Montessori Learning Center – Biñan Campus
Biñan Integrated National High School
Biñan National High School (Dela Paz Annex)
Biñan Secondary School of Applied Academics
Casa Del Niño Montessori School – Biñan Branch
Catholic School of Pacita
Citi Global College (formerly Don Bosco Global College-Biñan)
Colegio San Antonio-Biñan (formerly Saint Anthony School of Biñan)
Escuela de Gracia of Binan Inc
HeadStarter Workshop
Holy Family of Nazareth School
Holy Infant Jesus Of Prague School
Holy Spirit School
Integrated Jubilation Montessori Center of Biñan (Formerly International Jubilation Montessori Center of Biñan)
International Electronics And Technical Institute (IETI)-Biñan
Jacob Alfred A. Young School – Biñan
Jacobo Z. Gonzales Memorial National High School
Jacobo Z. Gonzales Memorial School Of Arts And Trades, a technical-vocational school
Kidsfirst Integrated School 
KIDS HAUS-Child Development Center Integrated School
Lake Shore Educational Institution
Liceo De Santo Tomas De Aquinas 
Biñan Elementary School
Malaban East Elementary School
Malaban Elementary School
Manila Montessori School
Montessori Children's Workshop
Nereo Joaquin National High School
Nereo R. Joaquin National High School
Panorama Montessori School
Saint-Sebastien Elementary school
San Francisco Elementary School
San Vicente Elementary School
South City Homes Academy
St. Francis of Assisi College
Santa Catalina College – Biñan
Trimex Colleges

International schools
The Beacon Academy
Brent International School Manila

Notable personalities 
 
 
 Ambrosio Rianzares Bautista, lawyer and author of the Declaration of Philippine Independence
 Fernando Canon, Filipino revolutionary general, poet, inventor, engineer, musician
 Encarnacion Alzona, National Scientist of the Philippines for Philippine History
 Dioscoro L. Umali, National Scientist of the Philippines for Agriculture and Rural Development
 Conrado M. Vasquez, first Ombudsman of the Philippines and an Associate Justice of the Supreme Court of the Philippines.
 Ronnie Alonte, actor, singer, dancer, It's Showtime, Hashtags member
 Angeli Gonzales, doctor
 Ken Chan, Filipino-Chinese actor from Laguna
 Zephanie Dimaranan, first grand winner of Idol Philippines
 Barbie Forteza, actress from Laguna, she is best known for her role in Pilyang Kerubin, Stairaway to Heaven, Meant to Be and Inday Will Always Love You
 Rose Ann Gonzales, multi-awarded former child actress now works for Congresswoman Len Alonte-Naguiat's Congressional Office
 Koreen Medina, Starstruck avenger, actress, Mutya ng Pilipinas 2013 Asia-Pacific
 Precious Lara Quigaman, actress, Miss International 2005
 Marco Sison, OPM icon, singer/actor, recording artist, served as former Board Member in the province of Laguna and also a former councilor from Biñan, Laguna
 Maurice Shaw, basketball player

Sister cities
Local
Cabuyao, Laguna
Santa Rosa, Laguna

References

External links

 [ Philippine Standard Geographic Code]
Philippine Census Information
Local Governance Performance Management System

 
Cities in Laguna (province)
Populated places established in 1688
1688 establishments in the Philippines
Populated places on Laguna de Bay
Component cities in the Philippines